Alexander Paal (May 18, 1910 – November 8, 1972) was a Hungarian film writer, director and producer. He considered one of the directors who were strongly influenced by the medieval European era.

Early life and education

Paal was born in Budapest on May 18, 1910.

He was once married to Hungarian-British actress Eva Bartok from 1948 to 1950. According to the sources, Paal helped Bartok in escaping from communist-ruled Hungary by arranging a "passport marriage". Later, he arranged Bartok's travel to London and gave her the leading role in his film A Tale of Five Cities (1951). The marriage was dissolved in the year 1951.

Filmography

Screenwriter 
 A Tale of Five Cities (1951)
 Stolen Face (1952)

Director 
 Columbus Discovers Kraehwinkel (1954)

Producer 
 Cloudburst (1951)
 A Tale of Five Cities (1951)
 Mantrap (1953)
 Four Sided Triangle (1953)
 Three Cases of Murder (1955)
 The Golden Head (1964)
 The Heroine (1967) – An incomplete film by Orson Welles, considered to be lost
 Countess Dracula (1971), this film is supposed to be his last one.

Actor 

 Budai cukrászda (1935)

External links

References

Hungarian film producers
Film people from Budapest
1910 births
1972 deaths
20th-century Hungarian screenwriters